Francisco Flores Córdoba (12 February 1926 – 13 November 1986) was a Mexican professional footballer, who played as a midfielder for Mexico national team  in the 1958 FIFA World Cup.

Club career
He also played for Chivas.

References

External links
 

1926 births
1986 deaths
Footballers from Jalisco
Association football midfielders
Mexico international footballers
1958 FIFA World Cup players
C.D. Guadalajara footballers
Mexican footballers